Aghushk Khoshk Kari (also Romanized as Aghūshk Khoshk Kārī; also known as Khoshk Kārī, Pāzar, and Pāzard) is a village in Kangan Rural District, in the Central District of Jask County, Hormozgan Province, Iran. At the 2006 census, its population was 147, in 24 families.

References 

Populated places in Jask County